Ancistrachne is a genus of plants in the grass family.

 Species
 Ancistrachne ancylotricha (Quisumb. & Merr.) S.T.Blake - Philippines
 Ancistrachne maidenii (A.A.Ham.) Vickery - New South Wales
 Ancistrachne numaeensis  (Balansa) S.T.Blake - New Caledonia
 Ancistrachne uncinulata (R.Br.) S.T.Blake - Queensland, New South Wales; introduced in Fiji

See also
 List of Poaceae genera

References

 
Poaceae genera